"Paint Me a Birmingham" is a song written by Buck Moore and Gary Duffy. It was concurrently released by American country music artists Ken Mellons and Tracy Lawrence, whose versions entered the country charts within one week of each other. Lawrence's was the more successful of the two, reaching #4 in May 2004 and becoming his first Top 5 country hit since "Lessons Learned" in April 2000.

Content
The narrator/singer describes an encounter with an artist who is painting ocean scenes. The singer asks the painter to paint a picture of the life the man had planned, or imagined, before losing the woman he loved. Specifically, he describes the house, a Birmingham-style house, and a scene where he and his love are together again. The song is in the key of G-flat major, modulating up to A-flat major at the last chorus, with a vocal range from A3 to D5.

Music video
The music video was filmed live in concert.

Chart positions

Ken Mellons

Tracy Lawrence

Year-end charts

Parodies
On his 2004 album Bipolar and Proud, country music parodist Cledus T. Judd parodied the song as "Bake Me a Country Ham". Judd's parody reached #58 on the country music charts.

References

2003 singles
Tracy Lawrence songs
Ken Mellons songs
Song recordings produced by James Stroud
DreamWorks Records singles
Songs written by Buck Moore
2003 songs
Songs about painters